Seethampeta is a village in Parvathipuram Manyam district of the Indian state of Andhra Pradesh. It is located in Seethampeta mandal of Palakonda revenue division.

References 

Villages in Parvathipuram Manyam district